David Anthony Lynn (born 20 October 1973) is an English professional golfer who played mainly on the European Tour, but took up full-time membership on the PGA Tour for the 2013 season.

He won the 1994 Greek Amateur Championship, where he finished eight shots ahead of David Howell. He turned professional in 1995. Lynn won three times in his professional career. His best European Tour Order of Merit finish was 18th in 2012, and he reached number 34 on the Official World Golf Ranking in 2013.

He notably finished second in the 2012 PGA Championship, eight strokes behind winner Rory McIlroy on five under par after consecutive rounds of 68 over the weekend. This was only his second appearance in a major championship and the result ensured a return to next year's PGA Championship, as well as a first ever visit to the Masters Tournament. He also moved up to a career high ranking of 40th.

On the back of his runner-up finish at the 2012 PGA Championship and having earned enough money as a non-member, Lynn joined the PGA Tour full-time for the 2013 season. Lynn came close to earning his first PGA Tour victory in May 2013 at the Wells Fargo Championship. He finished regulation play at eight-under-par, tied with American rookie Derek Ernst. However, Lynn lost on the first sudden-death playoff hole to an Ernst par, after hitting his second shot into a greenside bunker and was unable to get up-and-down for par.

In October 2013, Lynn won the Portugal Masters, shooting a final-round of 63 to win his first European Tour title in nine years. He retired after the 2014 season, suffering from tendonitis in his right elbow.

Amateur wins
1994 Greek Amateur Open Championship

Professional wins (3)

European Tour wins (2)

European Tour playoff record (0–1)

Challenge Tour wins (1)

Playoff record
PGA Tour playoff record (0–1)

Results in major championships

CUT = missed the half-way cut
"T" = tied
Note: Lynn never played in the U.S. Open.

Results in The Players Championship

"T" indicates a tie for a place

Results in World Golf Championships

QF, R16, R32, R64 = Round in which player lost in match play
"T" = Tied

Team appearances
Amateur
European Youths' Team Championship (representing England): 1994
Professional
Seve Trophy (representing Great Britain & Ireland): 2013

References

External links

English male golfers
European Tour golfers
PGA Tour golfers
People from Billinge, Merseyside
Sportspeople from Stoke-on-Trent
1973 births
Living people